Kate MccGwire (born 1964) is a British sculptor who specializes in the medium of feathers. Her work experiments with the binary notions of beauty and disgust, malice, tranquility, and the familiar yet otherworldly. Her use of pigeon feathers takes a waste product of the ‘rats with wings’ and elevates them to the status of art. By re-framing the object and placing it out of context, the artwork generates a kind of ‘field of attraction’ around it, and the viewer is left both seduced and alienated, relishing the spectacle, intrigued but at the same time aware of something disquieting, something ‘other’.

Much of MccGwire's practice references Freud's 'Unheimlich' (the uncanny, or, literally, the 'unhomely'), the idea of a place where the familiar can somehow excite fear. It also embraces artistic notions of the abject. In so doing the artist creates a shift from a world in which objects sit in their conventional place and allows a new perspective, exposing the viewer, in the most visceral way possible, to the truths that lurk behind the familiar and to the reality of what it is to be human – a brutal but also unrelentingly beautiful consciousness of the ugly and the funereal, fear and disgust.

MccGwire's exhibition history includes solo shows at All Visual Arts (2012) and Pertwee, Anderson and Gold (2011), as well as numerous groups shows such as at Glass tress (2015) at the Venice Biennale alongside artists such as Polly Morgan and Jake and Dinos Chapman. MccGwire's work is also collected by several notable figures in the art world including Charles Saatchi.

MccGwire was born in Norwich, Norfolk. She was educated at Manchester Polytechnic, Surrey Institute of Art & Design, University College and the Royal College of Art. MccGwire uses a Dutch barge moored on the Thames near Hampton Court as her studio.

References

External links

1964 births
21st-century British sculptors
Abstract sculptors
Alumni of the Royal College of Art
Alumni of Manchester Metropolitan University
English sculptors
English women sculptors
Artists from Norwich
Living people
21st-century British women artists
20th-century English women
20th-century English people
21st-century English women
21st-century English people